In art, symbolic language is the use of characters or images to represent concepts and imagery to communicate meaning by displaying an accessible concept, the signifier, to represent a signified concept.

Symbolic language in art may be used figuratively, to reference ideas and "convey concepts in terms of images", as when images and positioning of objects such as flowers or animals are used to signify cultural concepts.

Symbolic language in art may be used more literally, as in floriography, where arrangements of flowers are decoded with the help of special dictionaries, enabling communication of secret, unspoken information as a form of cryptography.

Similarly, in religious iconography, symbolic languages may be developed to communicate between believers in a hostile environment, with progressive teachings providing increasing access to hidden meanings in the images.

See also
Icon
Ineffability
Petroglyph
Saint symbolism
Semiotics
Symbolic language (other)
Symbolism (arts)
Yerkish lexigrams

References

External links

Bach's Symbolic Language - JSTOR
Beyond Words: The Symbolic Logic of Plants - Delaware Art Museum
In Defense of Symbolic Aesthetics - JSTOR
The Language of Flowers - Philadelphia Museum of Art
Saints, Signs, and Symbols: The Symbolic Language of Christian Art
The Symbolical Language of Ancient Art and Mythology: An Inquiry - Cornell University

Iconography
Language
Visual arts